Herbert E. Farnsworth (August 23, 1834 – July 4, 1908) was an American soldier who fought in the American Civil War. Farnsworth received the country's highest award for bravery during combat, the Medal of Honor, for his action during the Battle of Trevilian Station at Trevilian Station in Virginia on 11 June 1864. He was honored with the award on 1 April 1898.

Biography
Farnsworth was born in Perrysburg, New York on 23 August 1834. He joined the 10th New York Cavalry as a bugler in September 1861. By June 1864, the time of his meritorious action, he was the regiment's Sergeant Major.  He was commissioned as a first lieutenant in August 1864 and mustered out in June 1865. Farnsworth died on 4 July 1908 and his remains are interred at the Pomeroy City Cemetery in Washington.

Medal of Honor citation

See also

List of American Civil War Medal of Honor recipients: A–F

References

1834 births
1908 deaths
People of New York (state) in the American Civil War
Union Army officers
United States Army Medal of Honor recipients
American Civil War recipients of the Medal of Honor
People from Perrysburg, New York